María Fernanda Barrantes Rojas (born 12 April 1989) is a Costa Rican footballer who play as a forward.

References

External links
 
 Profile  at Fedefutbol
 

1989 births
Living people
Costa Rican women's footballers
Costa Rica women's international footballers
2015 FIFA Women's World Cup players
Women's association football forwards
Footballers at the 2015 Pan American Games
Pan American Games competitors for Costa Rica